Jai Bhim is a 2021 Indian Tamil-language legal thriller film directed by T. J. Gnanavel and produced by Jyothika and Suriya under 2D Entertainment. The film stars Suriya, Lijomol Jose and Manikandan, with Rajisha Vijayan, Prakash Raj, Rao Ramesh and others in supporting roles. The film deals with the subject of police bias and state violence against a marginalised community. Based on a true incident in 1993, which involves a case fought by Justice K. Chandru, it revolves around the lives of Sengeni and Rajakannu, a couple from the Irular tribe. Rajakannu was arrested by the police, and was later missing from the police station. Sengeni seeks the help of an advocate Chandru to seek justice for her husband.

Following an official announcement in April 2021, the film began principal photography that month, with many sequences being shot in Chennai and Kodaikanal. Production was halted due to the COVID-19 pandemic and filming resumed in July 2021. It was completed that September. The film's cinematography and editing were handled by S. R. Kathir and Philomin Raj respectively. The music and film score is composed by Sean Roldan. The film's title is a reference to the slogan used by followers of B. R. Ambedkar.

Jai Bhim was released on Amazon Prime Video, prior to Diwali, on 2 November 2021, as part of a multi-film deal signed by 2D Entertainment. The film received universal acclaim from critics, who praised the story, performances, direction and social message, and several publications listed the film as one of the best Tamil and Indian films of 2021.

Plot 
In 1993, Rajakannu and Sengeni are a couple from the oppressed Irula tribe who labor in the fields of oppressive caste men to control rat infestation and catch venomous snakes. Rajakannu is called to a rich man's dwelling to catch a snake that sneaked inside a room. The next day, a case of burglary is reported when the wife of the man reports missing jewellery pieces from her closet and raises doubt on Rajakannu. The police invade Rajakannu's home to find evidence. Rajakannu had left the town earlier for work. During the invasion, the police brutally beat and unlawfully detain the pregnant Sengeni. The police arrest other relatives: Rajakannu's brother Iruttupan, his sister Pachaiammal and his brother-in-law Mosakutty, and torture them to confess Rajakannu's whereabouts. The police find Rajakannu and imprison him. They torture him to confess the crime but release Sengeni. Later, she is informed that all three men in detention are absconding and police threaten her furthermore to tell them about their whereabouts.

Mythra, who teaches adults from the Irula tribe, learns about Chandru, a lawyer who fights cases for tribal communities, and manages to convince him to seek justice for Sengeni. After listening to the narration of all events that happened until then from Sengeni, Chandru files a habeas corpus case in the court. Initially the court advises them to file the petition in a lower court, but Chandru asks for witness examination, which is not the procedure in a habeas corpus case. But Chandru cites the Rajan case, and the court yields. The Solicitor general appearing for the police, based on the police officers' evidence, argues that Rajakannu and the other two had absconded from the police custody the night they were arrested. Finding gaps in the witnesses' statements, Chandru discovers that they were committing perjury and asks the court to investigate Sub-Inspector Gurumurthy (a casteist), head constable Veerasamy, and constable Kirubakaran.

Advocate General Ram Mohan takes over the case, and in defense of the police, claims that the three accused have fled to Kerala. Varadarajulu, the employer of Iruttapan, acknowledges that Iruttapan informed him through a phone call that he had fled to Kerala after committing robbery. Chandru discovered that the three policemen in question went to Kerala to make a phone call to Varadarajulu which Guru admits, that he mimicked the voice of Iruttapan. The court appoints IG Perumalsamy as the lead officer of this case, upon Chandru's request. After continuing search for weeks, Chandru, Perumalsamy and Mythra find that Rajakannu's corpse was found in the middle of a road near meters into border of Pondicherry, the day after he supposedly fled. He was cremated after being photographed as an unknown man. Both believe that Rajakannu did not die due to a car accident, rather due to lock-up murder.

Chandru consults the pathologist who conducted the post-mortem examination on Rajakannu. The pathologist says the cause of death was due to the breaking of the ribcage, which in turn, led a fragment of bone being driven into Rajakannu's heart, but theorises that this could be caused by a car running over him. Veerasamy confesses to Ram Mohan that Rajakannu died in custody. Veerasamy called Guru after the death. Guru told Veerasamy that he should stage that both have escaped and leave Rajakannu on the road, framing his death as occurring due to a car accident. Mosakutty and Iruttapan were transferred to another jail in Kerala. After hearing this, Ram Mohan advises them to maintain their narrative in court. Chandru checks the call history of the police station and informs the court that a call to Guru's residence was made at 9:10pm, which does not corroborate with Veerasamy's evidence. Chandru asks the court for more time to investigate.

Chandru, Mythra, Sengeni, and the Irular tribe campaign against the injustice that had happened. Chandru finds that Irutappan indeed called Varadarajulu, but the police coerced him to make that call. Mythra finds Iruttapan and Mosakutty, and they testify in court about the torture all three of them went through and how the policemen killed Rajakannu. Perumalsamy says the policemen took bribes from the actual thief. Chandru also says that on the road where Rajakannu's corpse was found, there were a set of tire marks. There were also footprints that matched Guru's and Kiruba's footprints. After hearing these evidence, the court announces the verdict: the policemen who killed Rajakannu will be arrested; Sengeni will get  and half a ground land as compensation; and Iruttapan, Mosakutty and Pachaiamma will get  each. Sengeni thanks Chandru for his help, and Chandru attends the inauguration of Sengeni's new house, fulfilling Rajakannu's dream to get Sengeni a new house.

Cast 

 Suriya as Adv. Chandru, a lawyer who fights cases for tribal communities
 Lijomol Jose as Sengeni Rajakannu, a tribal woman who wants justice for her missing husband
 Manikandan as Rajakannu, Sengeni's husband who dies in police custody
 Rajisha Vijayan as Mythra, an adult teacher for the Irula tribe (Voice dubbed by Raveena Ravi)
 Prakash Raj as IG Perumalsamy, the lead officer of the case
 Baby Joshika Maya as Alli Rajakannu, Sengani and Rajakannu's daughter
 Rao Ramesh as Advocate general Ram Mohan
 Guru Somasundaram as PP Chellapandiyan
 Tamizh as Sub-inspector Gurumoorthy, a casteist cop and one of the murderers
 Supergood Subramani as Constable Veerasamy, one of the murderers
 Bala Hasan as Constable Kirubakaran, one of the murderers
 M. Chinraasu as Irutappan, Rajakannu's brother
 Subhadra as Pachaiyammal, Rajakannu's sister
 Rajendran as Mosakutty, Rasakannu's brother-in-law
 Jayaprakash as DGP Radhakrishnan
 M. S. Bhaskar as Sankaran
 Ilavarasu as Gunasekaran, the village president
 Kumaravel as Albi Antony, a police officer
 Jaya Rao as Kathirvel
 Sujatha Sivakumar as Subbulakshmi
 Ravi Venkatraman as Inspector Bashyam
 Sibi Thomas as SP Ashok Varadhan
 Raja Rani Pandian as Rajan
 Shankar Sundaram as Sathyadev
 Jijoy Rajagopal as Munnar Rajesh
 Sanjay Swaroop as Judge
 Kumar Natarajan as Advocate
 Bava Chelladurai as Krishnan
 David Solomon Raja as Sasikumar Pandian
 Anagoor Raaju as Rajakannu's uncle
 Deepa as Irutappan's wife
 Kaveri as Mosakutty's wife
 Bigil Siva as Dr. Mahesh
 Sivaranjani as Gunasekaran's wife
 V. Renganathan as Rajakannu's employer
 Srikanth as rice mill Owner
 Rajesh Balachandran as Nataraj
 Aravind Seiju as Madhan
 Pandian as Rajan
 P. R. Kaalishwaran as Kalyani
 S. Ravi as Elumalai
 K. Raju as Vinod
 P. R. George as Rajesh
 Batman as Ravi
 Kulotungan as jewellery shop owner
 Dhanasekar as a tea shop owner
 Ramachandran as Judge
 Dayalan as jailor
 Yuva as Arunachalam
 Dandapani as Ramasamy
 Ashokan as Kaaliappan
 Saravanan as Sekhar
 Deva as Sankar
 Kumarasamy as Janakiraman
 Subramanian as Rangarajan

Production

Development 
In March 2020, media reports surfaced that Suriya would be collaborating with T. J. Gnanavel, director of Kootathil Oruthan (2017) fame, for a legal drama film based on tribal people. Gnanavel earlier worked as dialogue writer in the Tamil-dubbed version of Suriya's Rakta Charitra 2 (2010), which was titled Ratha Sarithram. It was further stated that the film would be based on a true incident in 1993, and Suriya plays the role of a lawyer. His role is based on the real-life of retired Madras High Court Justice and former senior advocate K. Chandru, who faced a legal battle in order to bring justice for an Irular tribe woman. Her husband Rajakannu was arrested due to some unfortunate events and later disappeared from the police station that night. In the hope of justice for Rajakannu, she sought the help of Chandru who went beyond conventional lines to unearth the truth and bring justice to the woman and her family. Gnanavel also met the lawyer and interacted with him for several weeks, to understand further about the case. The team also took a workshop from actor–director R. Madhavan on making a biopic of a prominent individual in a short span of time, following the actor's work on Rocketry: The Nambi Effect (2022).

Casting 

The project was formally announced in April 2021, with Suriya himself producing the film under 2D Entertainment banner. Initially, Roshini Haripriyan was approached for the role of Senggeni. But eventually the role went to Lijomol Jose. In May 2021, Malayalam film Rajisha Vijayan signed in for a pivotal role after her Tamil debut with Karnan (2021). Prakash Raj, Rao Ramesh and K. Manikandan, amongst others, were reportedly signed in for supporting roles, with music composer Sean Roldan, editor Philomin Raj, videographer S. R. Kathir, production designer Jacki and stunt co-ordinator duo Anbariv also a part of the technical crew. The title of the film Jai Bhim (based on the slogan used by followers of B. R. Ambedkar), was announced on 23 July 2021 (Suriya's birthday), with a first look release. The title was already taken by director Pa. Ranjith, a follower of Ambedkar's ideologies, and Suriya said Ranjith gave the film crew the title.

Filming 
Principal photography began in Kodaikanal during mid-April 2021, with Suriya joining the sets despite shooting for Etharkkum Thunindhavan (2021) in Karaikkudi. As production of the latter was halted due to the COVID-19 pandemic, Suriya began working on the project with the shooting in Kodaikanal, which was further interrupted due to the pandemic and the subsequent lockdown. In July 2021, shooting of the film resumed. Principal photography was wrapped up by September 2021.

Post-production 
In October 2021, the final copy of the film was submitted to the Central Board of Film Certification, which gave the film an "A" (adults-only) certificate, as some scenes have content that is suitable only for mature audiences. It is the first time a Suriya-starrer was given this rating since Rakta Charitra 2.

Music 

The film score and soundtrack is composed by Sean Roldan in his first collaboration with Suriya. The lyrics for the songs were written by Yugabharathi, Raju Murugan and Arivu. In August 2021, Roldan recorded the first track of the film (which was later deciphered as "Power Song") with vocals and lyrics written by Arivu. He further recorded the film's background score with orchestrator Matt Dunkley at Abbey Road Studios, London, with a snippet from the recording sessions uploaded to social media during mid-October. The music rights were purchased by Sony Music India, and the first single "Power Song" was released on 6 October 2021. The second single "Thala Kodhum" sung by Pradeep Kumar was released on 18 October.

The original soundtrack album consisting of five tracks was released through music streaming platforms on 27 October 2021, with the jukebox being unveiled on YouTube, a day later. After the film's release, Sean Roldan performed few lines from the unreleased hidden track titled "Manniley Eeramundu" which was played during the climax of the film, at a chat session and following multiple requests, the makers released the aforementioned track as a single on 15 November 2021.

Release

Streaming 
On 5 August 2021, 2D Entertainment signed a four-film deal with the streaming service Amazon Prime Video. As part of this deal, four of the studio's upcoming projects would premiere directly on Prime Video while bypassing theatrical release, which is a result of estimated losses incurred by non-existent theatrical releases due to the pandemic. Jai Bhim was scheduled for a streaming release during November 2021. On 2 October, the makers announced that the film would be released worldwide on 2 November 2021, ahead of the Diwali festival. In addition, the film was dubbed in Hindi, Telugu, Malayalam and Kannada languages. The film was screened at the 9th edition of Noida International Film Festival on 23 January 2022. The film will also be showcased under the "World Competition" segment at the 20th edition of Pune International Film Festival which will be held on 3–10 March 2022.

Home media 
The satellite rights were acquired by Kalaignar TV, and the film had its television premiere on 15 January 2022, coinciding with Pongal.

Reception

Critical response 
The film received critical acclaim praising the script, performances (of Suriya, Lijomol Jose and Manikandan), direction and technical aspects.

Ranjani Krishnakumar of Film Companion wrote, "Jai Bhim is a solid film held together by craftly [sic] writing, thoughtful filmmaking, restrained performances and a true incident of the justice system restoring hope." NDTV-based chief critic Saibal Chatterjee gave the film 3.5 out of 5 writing" The amalgamation of the lead actor's charisma, the urgency of the theme and the force of the no-holds-barred storytelling results in an immersive and riveting film that calls attention to the plight of an oppressed community languishing on the fringes of society." S. Srivatsan of The Hindu wrote "'Jai Bhim' is perhaps one of the boldest films to have come out of Tamil cinema. It doesn't dare turn its back on hitting where it hurts the most, and its politics is not weighed down by the presence of a star like Suriya" Writing for The Indian Express, Manoj Kumar R. gave the film 4 out of 5 writing "Suriya feels natural and very comfortable in the role of a firebrand advocate. It is as if he's not just performing the lines written by the director, but he really believes in every word and gesture he delivers in this film." Sowmya Rajendran of The News Minute also gave the film 4 out of 5 while writing "As a courtroom drama and investigative thriller, based on real events, 'Jai Bhim' is head and shoulders above the average fare."

M. Suganth of The Times of India gave the film 3.5 out of 5 writing "Gnanavel gives us some terrific moments of defiance. Lijomol Jose is quietly powerful as Sengani, who gets a couple of rousing scenes when she turns down efforts at a compromise from cops. Manikandan, too, is effective and stands out in the scene when he urges his men to not give in as that will result in their community being branded as criminals. The director also portrays the intimacy between Sengani and Rajakannu in a charming manner". Ashameera Aiyyappan of Firstpost gave the film 4 out of 5 writing "Jai Bhim is hard-hitting and intense. Unlike most commercial star vehicles, the film is decisively realistic. It tells a deeply important story with great nuance, ensuring that the people are not reduced to stereotypes." Hindustan Times-based Haricharan Pudipeddi wrote "Jai Bhim also talks about caste-based discrimination, and it doesn't try to sugar-coat things in the process. One of the highlights of Jai Bhim are the courtroom sequences which have been shot in the most realistic fashion. Suriya brings earnestness in his performance and plays the role of a lawyer with a lot of maturity, ensuring that his star image never comes in the way. It's Manikandan, who leaves you stunned with a gut-wrenching performance. Most of his scenes are shot in the interrogation room and he brings out the helplessness of his character effectively. Lijomol Jose as the lone woman standing against system that is rigged against her, is one of the best casting choices in recent times in Tamil cinema." A critic from Onmanorama gave the film 3.5 out of 5 writing "Rather than being a mere courtroom drama, Jai Bhim is a much-needed film from the past that will be relevant in the years to come, with new hope and a new beginning."

Janani K. of India Today gave the film 4.5 out of 5 writing "Jai Bhim is an important film in the history of Tamil cinema. It shows how caste discrimination and injustice kill people. Jai Bhim is a film that also talks about the lack of humanity. Jai Bhim is a must-watch for its hard-hitting content and its ideologies. It's what society needs right now." Sudhir Srinivasan, writing for Cinema Express gave the film 3.5 writing that "despite all the attempts to create an engaging court experience, the film fails to create strong lawyer adversaries for Chandru [...] And yet, for all these missteps that prevent Jai Bhim from being an unforgettable film, it's still necessary to note that this is an important film that documents, with passion and good intentions, the oppression of a community. It's a film co-produced by a star, who's brave enough to almost slide himself into the background. Yes, he's a saviour in this film, sure, but he is not of the henchmen-beating, heroine-advising, agency-robbing kind, and neither is he the centrepoint of this story. Though he's a saviour, you could argue that he's also a 'victim'... of his good conscience. "It's the only way I can get a good night's sleep," he says, explaining his motivation to represent the vulnerable. If only our society created more such victims". Chief-editor Harish Wankhede's review in The Hindu suggests that the protagonist is "an Ambedkarite hero who struggles to protect the life and dignity of the tribal people by adopting democratic and legal apparatuses. Further, the film presents the victim Sanggeni not as a powerless and wretched spectator but as a dignified claimant of equal rights and justice. It equally focuses on her brave struggle against the powerful establishment and promotes her as a parallel protagonist of the story.

Accolades 
The film was made available for screening at the 94th Academy Awards, but failed to get nominated.

Controversies 

Jai Bhim attracted opposition by the Vanniyar caste group Vanniyar Sangam (the parent organisation of Pattali Makkal Katchi or PMK), regarding a scene involving the character sub-inspector Gurumoorthy, which the PMK leaders claimed insulted the community. PMK leader Anbumani Ramadoss wrote a letter posing a series of questions about the film and how it defamed the community. In the film, an image of a pot of fire (a symbol of the Vanniyar community) was seen on a wall calendar in the sub-inspector's residence.

Ramadoss criticised the choice to name the sub-inspector as Gurumoorthy, which he claims defames PMK leader Kaduvetti Guru. While the film used the names of the individuals in the case for their on-screen characters, the sub-inspector's character was not given the analogous individual's name, which was Anthonysamy. Suriya however responded that the film's team did not have any intention of hurting any single individual or a particular community. He also said that "Through the film, questions have been raised against those in power, it should not be turned into name-politics and diluted."

Amid threats from supporters of the PMK and the Vanniyar Sangam, police protection was given to Suriya's residence in T. Nagar, Chennai. Numerous filmmakers, including Vetrimaaran, Lokesh Kanagaraj, Pa. Ranjith, C. S. Amudhan, Prakash Raj (who appeared in the film), Sathyaraj, and Siddharth, publicly spoke up in favour of Suriya, while associations such as South Indian Film Chamber of Commerce, Tamil Film Active Producers Association, and Nadigar Sangam raised objections to the attacks. The hashtag #WeStandWithSuriya started trending on Twitter, to which Suriya responded by thanking fans for their "overwhelming support". Gnanavel apologised on Twitter, saying that he takes responsibility for the controversy and that it was unfair to blame Suriya.

A scene in the film where Prakash Raj's character Perumalsamy slaps a pawnbroker for speaking in Hindi and tells him to speak in Tamil sparked controversy on social media and was opposed by BJP. Some stated that it promoted anti-Hindi sentiment, while others countered by saying that Perumalsamy slaps the pawnbroker for trying to confuse him and evade questioning by speaking in a language that he does not understand when he can speak in Tamil. Prakash Raj responded to this by saying that "they did not see the agony of the tribal people, they did not see and feel terrible about the injustice, they saw only the slap. That is all they understood; this exposes their agenda", but confirmed that the pawnbroker, who knows Tamil, was indeed trying to evade questioning by speaking in Hindi.

On 11 August 2022, the Madras High Court quashed criminal proceedings against Suriya and Gnanavel for allegedly hurting the sentiment of the Vanniyar community in the film. While the complainant had said that the film intended to incite violence and hostility on a particular community, the court observed that no such instance had been recorded.

Social impact 
Jai Bhim received an overwhelming response from members across the film fraternity, including Kamal Haasan, Siddharth, R. Madhavan, and Sivakarthikeyan, amongst others. Justice K. Chandru, who was closely associated with the film from the story discussions to post-production work had stated in an interview with The Federal, saying that "the film is not a mere retelling of Sengini's tragic tale, but is more about throwing light on the larger picture of the victimisation of vulnerable communities like the Irula tribe". M. K. Stalin, the Chief Minister of Tamil Nadu, praised the film saying it had occupied his thoughts all night long. He stated that the core issue of the film reminded him of his own time in prison when arrested in 1976 under MISA (Maintenance of Internal Security Act, 1971) during the emergency period, and that his heart felt very heavy after watching the film. He congratulated Suriya and Gnanavel, and the entire film unit, saying that he wished more such films were made. Responding to Stalin's compliments, Suriya said, "I am running out of words. The compliments of the Chief Minister have fulfilled the intent of Jai Bhim" and thanked the politician on behalf of the team. Suriya promised to open a fixed deposit of 10 lakh in the name of Parvati Ammal. He said, "The interest accrued for the FD will be handed over to Parvati Ammal every month and it will be ensured that the amount goes to her children after her death".

It was IMDb's most popular Indian film of the year. Jai Bhim also became the most-searched film of 2021 in India on Google. It was also fourth in the list of films that were tweeted about most in 2021, according to a report published by Twitter. Several publications including The Indian Express, The News Minute, Hindustan Times, Firstpost, and India Today, listed Jai Bhim as one of the best Tamil films of 2021. According to the social networking site Letterboxd, it was listed in the 15th position of "highest rated International films of 2021". A scene from the film was listed on The Oscars' official YouTube channel as a part of the segment "Scene at the Academy", with T. J. Gnanavel exploring about the making of the film. Raj Shinde, critic-based at the Indian website ThePrint cited Jai Bhim as one of the examples of how Indian cinema evolved in producing anti-caste films. The screenplay of the book published by Arunchol was published on January 2023.

References

External links 
 

2020s legal drama films
2021 direct-to-video films
2021 films
Amazon Prime Video original films
Cultural depictions of B. R. Ambedkar
Cultural depictions of Karl Marx
Drama films based on actual events
Fictional portrayals of the Tamil Nadu Police
Film productions suspended due to the COVID-19 pandemic
Films about lawsuits
Films about lawyers
Films about police brutality
Films about social issues in India
Films about the caste system in India
Films scored by Sean Roldan
Films set in 1993
Films set in Kerala
Films set in Tamil Nadu
Films shot in Karaikudi
Films shot in Kodaikanal
Indian direct-to-video films
Indian legal drama films